The 2023 Davis Cup World Group II will be held on 15–17 September. The twelve winners from the World Group II will play at the World Group I Play-offs and the twelve losers will play at the World Group II Play-offs in 2024.

Teams
Twenty-four teams will participate in the World Group II, in series decided on a home and away basis. The seedings are based on the Nations Ranking.

These twenty-four teams are:
12 losing teams from the 2023 World Group I Play-offs, in February 2023
12 winning teams from the 2023 World Group II Play-offs, in February 2023

The 12 winning teams from the World Group II will play at the World Group I Play-offs and the 12 losing teams will play at the World Group II Play-offs in 2024.

#: Nations Ranking as of 6 February 2023.

Seeded teams
  (#32)
  (#40)
  (#43)
  (#44)
  (#45=)
  (#45=)
  (#47)
  (#48)
  (#49)
  (#50)
  (#51)
  (#52)

Unseeded teams
  (#53)
  (#54)
  (#55)
  (#56)
  (#57)
  (#58)
  (#59)
  (#60)
  (#61)
  (#62)
  (#63)
  (#65)

Results summary

Results

Monaco vs. Ecuador

India vs. Morocco

New Zealand vs. Thailand

Mexico vs. China

Pakistan vs. Indonesia

Uruguay vs. Egypt

Lebanon vs. Jamaica

Slovenia vs. Luxembourg

Georgia vs. Tunisia

El Salvador vs. Ireland

Hong Kong vs. Latvia

Poland vs. Barbados

References

External links
Draw

World Group II